Merel Else Mooren (born 22 September 1982) is a Dutch professional beach volleyball and indoor volleyball player born in Haarlem.

In indoor volleyball Mooren started her career in 1989 at Allides Haarlem where she was part of the youth teams. The Dutch youth team called her up in 1996 and she was part of the team until 2000, winning a silver medal at the European Youth Championships. From 1997 until 2002 she played for Martinus Amstelveen in the highest Dutch league. Then she decided to switch sports to beach volleyball.

She started her international beach volleyball career in 2002, teaming up with Mered de Vries. The talented team did not last long and in the following year Mooren had a new partner called Sanne Keizer. They quickly became one of the best teams in The Netherlands. They even became Dutch champions by breaking the run set by Rebekka Kadijk who was teaming up with Marrit Leenstra at that time. In 2004 they finished second behind this team, but they won the FIVB Satellite tournament in Lausanne. After the 2004 Summer Olympics Kadijk/Leenstra decided to split up. Mooren was Kadijk's next partner, while Leenstra continued with Sanne Keizer. The combination Kadijk/Mooren was nearly unbeatable in their own country. In 2005 and 2006 they became Dutch national champions. In both 2005 (Moscow) and 2006 (Scheveningen) they reached the final of the European Championships. In both occasions the final was lost and they won the silver medals twice. In 2007 they won their first European Tour Tournament, prevailing in the final of the German Masters in Hamburg.

External links
 Official site 
 
 
 
 

1982 births
Living people
Dutch women's volleyball players
Dutch women's beach volleyball players
Beach volleyball players at the 2008 Summer Olympics
Olympic beach volleyball players of the Netherlands
Sportspeople from Haarlem
20th-century Dutch women
21st-century Dutch women